"I Only Get This Way with You" is a song written by Dave Loggins and Alan Ray, and recorded by American country music artist Rick Trevino.  It was released in March 1997 as the third single from the album Learning as You Go.  The song reached number 7 on the Billboard Hot Country Singles & Tracks chart.

Critical reception
Deborah Evans Price, of Billboard magazine reviewed the song favorably calling the song, "well crafted" and "sweetly sentimental". Price goes on to say that Trevino turns in a "warm, thoughtful performance that gives the song a light, dreamy quality."

Chart performance
"I Only Get This Way with You" debuted at number 67 on the U.S. Billboard Hot Country Singles & Tracks for the week of March 22, 1997.

Year-end charts

References

1997 singles
1996 songs
Rick Trevino songs
Songs written by Dave Loggins
Song recordings produced by Steve Buckingham (record producer)
Columbia Records singles
Song recordings produced by Doug Johnson (record producer)